The Kingdom of France (the remnant of the preceding absolutist Kingdom of France) was a constitutional monarchy that governed France from 3 September 1791 until 21 September 1792, when this constitutional monarchy was succeeded by the First Republic.

On 3 September 1791, the National Constituent Assembly forced king Louis XVI to accept the French Constitution of 1791, thus turning the absolute monarchy into a constitutional monarchy.

After the 10 August 1792 Storming of the Tuileries Palace, the Legislative Assembly on 11 August 1792 suspended this constitutional monarchy. The freshly elected National Convention abolished the monarchy on 21 September 1792, ending 203 years of consecutive Bourbon rule over France.

Background
France had been undergoing a revolution in its government and social orders. A National Assembly declared itself into being and promulgated their intention to provide France with a fair and liberal constitution. Louis XVI moved to Paris in October of that year but grew to detest Paris and organised an escape plot in 1791. The escape plot known as the Flight to Varennes ultimately failed to materialise and destroyed any positive public opinion for the monarchy. Louis XVI's brothers-in-exile in Coblenz rallied for an invasion of France. Austria and Prussia responded to the royal brothers' cries and released the Declaration of Pillnitz in August. The declaration stated that Prussia and Austria wished to restore Louis XVI to absolute power but would only attempt to do so with the assistance of the other European powers.

Constitution
Louis XVI was forced to submit the Constitution of 1791 by the National Assembly in the aftermath of his Flight to Varennes in the Austrian Netherlands. The Constitution of 1791, which established the Kingdom of the French, was revolutionary in its content. It abolished the nobility of France and created all men equal before the law. Louis XVI had the ability to veto legislation that he did not approve of, as the legislation still needed Royal Assent to come into force.

Republic
Louis XVI reluctantly declared war on Austria on 20 April 1792 bowing to the assembly's wishes. Prussia allied with Austria and therefore France was at war with Prussia as well. The Brunswick Manifesto of August 1792 issued by the Duke of Brunswick, Commander of the Austrian and Prussian military brought about the Storming of the Tuileries on 10 August 1792. The manifesto explicitly threatened the people of Paris with dire repercussions if they in any way harmed Louis XVI or his family. The Legislative Assembly was inundated with requests for the monarchy's demise. The President of the National Assembly responded by suspending the monarchy on 11 August pending the outcome of elections for another assembly. The newly elected National Convention elected under universal male suffrage abolished the monarchy on 21 September 1792. The convention proclaimed a republic. Louis was executed by guillotine on 21 January 1793.

!bgcolor="#000000" colspan="6"|
|-

|-

|-

|-

|-

See also
 Louis XVI and the Legislative Assembly

Citations

References
Fraser, Antonia: "Marie Antoinette: the Journey", Orion Books, London, 2001, 
Hibbert, Christopher: "The French Revolution", Penguin Books, Great Britain, 1982, 
Jones, Colin: "The Great Nation: France from Louis XV to Napoleon", Columbia University Press, New York, 2002, 

Former monarchies of Europe
1791 establishments in France
1792 disestablishments in France
Louis XVI